Lysipomia laricina is a species of plant in the family Campanulaceae. It is endemic to Ecuador.  Its natural habitat is subtropical or tropical high-altitude grassland.

References

laricina
Endemic flora of Ecuador
Endangered plants
Taxonomy articles created by Polbot